Giovane Vieira de Paula (born 24 February 1998) is a Brazilian paracanoeist. He represented Brazil at the 2020 Summer Paralympics.

Career
Paula represented Brazil at the 2020 Summer Paralympics in the men's VL3 event and won a silver medal.

References

1998 births
Living people
Brazilian male canoeists
Paracanoeists at the 2020 Summer Paralympics
Medalists at the 2020 Summer Paralympics
Paralympic medalists in paracanoe
Paralympic silver medalists for Brazil
21st-century Brazilian people